Solanum paniculatum, commonly known as jurubeba, is a nightshade common in almost all of Brazil. It is used as a medicinal plant and has a bitter taste.

An infusion of its stem and its root in sugar cane alcohol (cachaça) is popularly used as an apéritif or a digestif.

Synonyms
Well known in its native range, this species has been described time and again under different now-invalid names. Some of these are homonyms of other Solanum taxa.

 Solanum belfort Vand.
 Solanum belfortianum Dunal
 Solanum botelhianum Dunal (unjustified emendation)
 Solanum botelho Vand.
 Solanum chloroleucum Dunal
 Solanum dictyoticum Roem. & Schult.
 Solanum jubeba Vell.
 Solanum macronema Sendtn.
 Solanum manoelii Moric.
 Solanum reticulatum Willd. ex Roem. & Schult.
Solanum reticulatum of de Jussieu from Dunal in de Candolle is S. vellozianum.
Solanum reticulatum of Dunal in Poiret is S. crotonoides as described by Lamarck
 Solanum rothelianum Steud. (lapsus)

Two varieties were once recognized, but they are not generally considered valid anymore:
 Solanum paniculatum var. ellipticum Chodat
Not to be confused with S. ellipticum, described by Brown. The S. ellipticum of de Conceição Vellozo refers to S. cylindricum.
 Solanum paniculatum var. integrifolium Dunal
Not to be confused with the S. integrifolium of Poiret, which refers to S. aethiopicum

Similar nightshade species that were once included with S. paniculatum but are now considered distinct are:
 Solanum pseudoauriculatum (as f. flavescens or ssp. pseudoauriculatum)
 Solanum acutilobum (as var. acutilobum)
 Solanum albidum Dunal (as var. chulumani)

References

Footnotes

  (2008): Solanum paniculatum. Version of February 2008. Retrieved 2008-SEP-25.

paniculatum
Flora of Brazil
Flora of the Cerrado
Medicinal plants